Melinda is a feminine given name.

Etymology 
The modern name Melinda is a combination of "Mel" with the suffix "-inda". "Mel" can be derived from names such as Melanie meaning "dark, black" in Greek, or from Melissa (μέλισσα) meaning "honeybee" in Greek. It is also associated with the Greek word meli, meaning "honey", and with Linda, from "lind" meaning "gentle, soft, tender" in the Germanic languages.

Pronunciation 
In Hungarian, the stress is on the first syllable: .

Usage and popularity 
The name Melinda is used in English and Hungarian. In the United States, its popularity peaked in 1973 at No. 72. In 1990 it was in the top 1000 names in the US, and in 2002 it was in the top 100 names in Hungary. Since its peak the popularity of the name Melinda has been gradually declining in the United States, to last be seen on the top 1000 list in 2002 at No. 932. Variations in spelling include Melynda, Melyndah, Malinda, and Milinda.

József Katona, Hungarian playwright and poet, used the name Melinda first in 1815 in his legendary historical tragedy Bánk bán.

In Hungary, December 2 is the name day for Melinda.

Notable people

Academics
Malinda Carpenter, Fellow of the Royal Society of Edinburgh, child development psychology researcher
Melinda H. Keefe, American art restorer
Melinda Mills, British sociologist
Melinda Takeuchi, American art historian
Melinda Tan, Singaporean linguist
Melinda Wortz, American art historian

Actors
Melinda Clarke, American actress
Melinda Y. Cohen, American actress
Melinda "Mindy" Cohn, American actress
Melinda Culea, American actress
Melinda Dillon, American actress
Melinda O. Fee, American actress
Melinda Kinnaman, Swedish actress
Melinda Marx, American actress and daughter of Groucho Marx
Melinda McGraw, American actress
Melinda Messenger, English model and TV presenter
Melinda Mullins, American actress
Melinda Page Hamilton, American actress
Melinda Shankar, Canadian actress
Melinda Sullivan, American dancer and actress
Melinda Sward, American actress
Malinda Williams, American actress

Artists
 Melinda Bordelon, American painter
Melinda Doring, Australian costume designer
 Melinda Looi, Malaysian fashion designer
Melinda Rackham, Australian artist

Entertainers
Melinda Bam South African model and beauty pageant titleholder
Melinda Ledbetter, wife and manager of Brian Wilson
Malinda Kathleen Reese, American YouTube personality, actress and singer
Melinda Saxe, American magician

Lawyers
 Melinda Haag, former US attorney
Melinda Harmon, US judge
Melinda Taylor, Australian ICC lawyer

Musicians
Melinda Caroll, American singer
Melinda Doolittle, American singer and American Idol contestant
Melinda Kistétényi, Hungarian organist
Melinda Maxwell, English oboist and composer
Melinda O'Neal, American conductor
Melinda Schneider, Australian Country Singer
Melinda Watts, American singer and musician

Philanthropists
Melinda Gates, philanthropist and ex-wife of Bill Gates

Politicians
Malinda Brumfield White (born 1967), American politician
Melinda Bush, Illinois senator
Melinda Katz, New York politician
Melinda MacLean, Canadian politician
Melinda Pavey, Australian politician
Melinda Schwegmann, Louisiana state representative and lieutenant-governor
Melinda Smyser, Idaho senator
Melinda Széky-Sztrémi, Hungarian politician

Reporters
Melinda Murphy, American reporter

Scientists
 Melinda Estes, American neuropathologist

Sportswomen
Melinda Cooper, American boxer
Melinda Copp, Canadian swimmer
Melinda Czink, Hungarian tennis player
Melinda Gainsford-Taylor, Australian athlete
Melinda Geiger, Romanian handballer
Melinda Hale, American handball player
Mélinda Hennaoui, Algerian volleyball player
Melinda Henshaw, New Zealand yachtswoman
Melinda Jacques, French handball player
Melinda Kunhegyi, Canadian figure skater
Melinda McLeod, Australian BMX cyclist
Melinda Padovano, American wrestler
Melinda Pastrovics, Hungarian handballer
Melinda Patyi, Hungarian canoeist
Melinda Sun, Australian badminton player
Melinda Szikora, Hungarian handballer
Melinda Szik, Hungarian weightlifter
Melinda Szvorda, Hungarian footballer
Melinda Vernon, Australian triathlete
Melinda Vincze, Hungarian handballer
Melinda Wang, Taiwanese figure skater
Melinda Young, Australia basketball

Writers
Melinda Camber Porter, British author, poet and painter
Melinda Gebbie, American comic author and artist
Melinda Hammond, British romance novelist
Melinda Haynes, American novelist
Melinda Hsu Taylor, American TV writer and producer
Malinda Lo, American author
Melinda Lopez, American playwright
Melinda Metz, American children's author
Melinda Nadj Abonji, Hungarian writer and performance artist
Melinda Rankin (1811–1888), American missionary, teacher, and writer
Melinda Smith, Australian poet
Melinda M. Snodgrass, American science fiction writer
Melinda Tankard Reist, Australian writer and social campaigner
Melinda Wagner, American composer and Pulitzer Prize winner

Other
Melinda Loveless, American teenager convicted for her role in the 1992 murder of Shanda Sharer

In popular culture

In film and television
Melinda (film), American film, 1972
Melinda and Melinda, American film, 2005
Melinda Gordon, Jennifer Love Hewitt's character from Ghost Whisperer
Melinda from The Real World: Austin
Melinda Warren and Melinda Halliwell, from TV show Charmed
Melinda Warner, Medical examiner on Law & Order: Special Victims Unit
Melinda Cramer, character on One Life to Live
Melinda May from Marvel's Agents of S.H.I.E.L.D.
Melinda, a centaur from the Disney movie Fantasia

In music
"Sweet Melinda, the peasants call her the Goddess of Gloom" from Just Like Tom Thumb's Blues by Bob Dylan, 1965
"I can't stay much longer,  Melinda, the sun is getting high." Cumberland Blues. Lyrics by Robert Hunter, performed by the Grateful Dead.
Melinda, one of the two main characters in the story of Swedish progressive death metal band Opeth's 1999 concept album Still Life, which includes the song "Face of Melinda"
"Sweet Dreams, Melinda" by Trey Anastasio on the album Shine
"Sweet Melinda" by John Denver on the album John Denver
"Come Away Melinda", written by Fred Hellerman and Fran Minkoff, and recorded by Harry Belafonte (on the album Streets I Have Walked), Judy Collins (Judy Collins 3), Theodore Bikel (A Folksinger's Choice), Tim Rose (Tim Rose), Bobbie Gentry (Local Gentry), Uriah Heep (...Very 'Eavy ...Very 'Umble), Velvett Fogg), Kenny Rankin (Mind-Dusters), The Big 3 (Live at the Recording Studio), and L.Stadt.
"Me and My Melinda" by Kay Kyser
"Remember Melinda" by TQ on the album They Never Saw Me Coming
"Melinda was mine..." from Solitary Man by Neil Diamond
"Melinda" by Curved Air, on the album Retrospective
"Melinda" by Tom Petty and the Heartbreakers

In literature
Melinda, wife of Bánk in József Katona's legendary historical tragedy Bánk bán
Melinda ("Lindy") in the book The Last of the Really Great Whangdoodles by Julie Andrews
Melinda Sordino, main character of the book Speak (1999) by Laurie Halse Anderson
Melinda, porn star mentioned in the book Snow by Orhan Pamuk
Melinda, picture book written by Neil Gaiman and illustrated by Dagmara Matusak

In agriculture
Melinda (consortium) is a consortium producing apples in Trentino

In geography
 Melinda Airport, Belize

See also

References

English feminine given names
English given names
Feminine given names
Hungarian feminine given names